The 1971 Motor Trend 500 was the first race in NASCAR's Winston Cup era (also known as the Winston Cup Grand National Series) that took place on January 10, 1971. 191 laps on a road course at Riverside International Raceway in Riverside, California that spanned a total distance of .

Attendance was estimated at 23,000. It took four hours, fifty-seven minutes, and fifty-five seconds.

Due to a then-struggling economy, both Ford and Chevrolet cut back on factory support for the 1971 NASCAR Winston Cup Series season. NASCAR would also limit engines in the aerodynamic superspeedway cars to 305 cubic inches starting in this race.

Race report
Defending NASCAR Grand National West series champion Ray Elder won the race; making it the first time that the 500-mile event at Riverside was won by a manufacturer other than Ford. This race was the final NASCAR Cup Series event with triple-digit numbered cars; with three of them qualifying for the race. (Kittlekow #107, Schilling #148, Collins #177). Elder became the first winner in NASCAR's "modern" history.

Only 11 cars finished this 5-hour marathon. The 8th-place finisher was 22 laps down, and the 11th-place finisher dropped out with 34 laps to go. The top prize at this race was $18,715 ($ when adjusted for inflation) and the prize for finishing last (40th) was $1,015 ($ when adjusted for inflation). Richard Petty competed in this race but failed to finish; he would end up in 20th after starting from the pole position. The majority of the drivers who failed to finish had an engine problem. 43-year-old Hershel McGriff entered and raced a Cup race for the first time since 1954, when he won a Grand National race at North Wilkesboro in an Oldsmobile, back when he was 26. McGriff would qualify in 8th and finish 12th.

Harry Hyde and Dale Inman were notable crew chiefs for this event; working for Richard Petty (Inman) and fourth-place finisher Bobby Isaac (Hyde).

At the end of the race, the margin between Elder and Bobby Allison was ten and a half seconds. Ray Elder would score the first of his two NASCAR cup victories here (with his second victory taking place at the 1972 Golden State 400). This race was Ron Grable's only start in the NASCAR Cup series and that G.T. Tallas finished the race with his career best of 11th place.

Qualifying

Finishing order

 Ray Elder
 Bobby Allison
 Benny Parsons
 Bobby Isaac
 James Hylton
 Friday Hassler
 Kevin Terris
 Carl Joiner
 Henley Gray
 Cecil Gordon
 G.T. Tallas
 Hershel McGriff
 Bob England
 Dick Kranzler
 J.D. McDuffie
 Dick Bown
 Elmo Langley
 Jack McCoy
 Ron Gautsche
 Richard Petty
 John Soares, Jr.
 Frank James
 Ron Grable
 Dick Guldstrad
 Jimmy Insolo
 Bill Champion
 Bob Kauf
 Paul Dorrity
 Jerry Oliver
 Frank Warren
 Mike Pittelkow
 Ray Johnstone
 Don Noel
 Glenn Francis
 David Pearson
 Joe Clark
 Harry Schilling
 Roy Collins
 Ivan Baldwin
 Pat Fay

Timeline
Section reference: 
 Start of race: Richard Petty had the lead position as the green flag was waved.
 Lap 4: Bobby Allison took over the lead from Richard Petty.
 Lap 5: David Pearson took over the lead from Bobby Allison.
 Lap 21: Joe Clark's vehicle developed transmission issues.
 Lap 25: Richard Petty took over the lead from David Pearson.
 Lap 36: Ray Johnstone had a terminal crash.
 Lap 38: Problems with the vehicle's clutch ended Mike Kittlekow's day on the track.
 Lap 40: Frank Warren developed terminal issues with his transmission.
 Lap 56: Bob Kauf's vehicle had a terminal transmission issue which knocked him out of the race.
 Lap 58: Bill Champion's vehicle had a terminal transmission issue which knocked him out of the race.
 Lap 76: Dick Guldstrad managed to lose a frame out of his vehicle, making his car too unsafe for further racing.
 Lap 84: Ray Elder took over the lead from Richard Petty.
 Lap 97: Frank James developed a faulty transmission in his vehicle.
 Lap 107: Bobby Allison took over the lead from Ray Elder.
 Lap 118: A faulty lug bolt ended Ron Gaustche's race.
 Lap 120: Ray Elder took over the lead from Bobby Allison.
 Lap 133: Steering issues brought Dick Bown's day on the track to a premature halt.
 Lap 136: Bobby Allison took over the lead from Ray Elder.
 Lap 150: Ray Elder took over the lead from Bobby Allison.
 Lap 155: Bob England managed to render his vehicle's engine non-functional.
 Lap 156: Hershel McGriff ruined the ignition of his vehicle by driving at high speeds.
 Lap 157: G.T. Tallas managed to render his vehicle's engine non-functional.
 Lap 166: Bobby Allison took over the lead from Ray Elder.
 Lap 180: Ray Elder took over the lead from Bobby Allison.
 Finish: Ray Elder was officially declared the winner of the event.

References

Motor Trend 500
Motor Trend 500
NASCAR races at Riverside International Raceway